Ebez ( meaning "tin", or "white") also rendered Abez, was a town in the allotment of the tribe of Issachar, at the north of the Jezreel Valley, or plain of Esdraelon. F. R. and C. R. Conder (1879), believed that it was probably the ruins of el-Beida, but William Robertson Smith (1899) expressed doubt about this identification. According to the 1915 International Standard Bible Encyclopedia (1915), the location is not known. It is mentioned on the façade of the Mortuary Temple of Ramesses III at Medinet Habu as Apijaa.

References

Hebrew Bible cities